Lichtheimia is a genus of fungi belonging to the family Lichtheimiaceae.

The genus has cosmopolitan distribution.

Species

Species:
 Lichtheimia blakesleeana 
 Lichtheimia brasiliensis 
 Lichtheimia corymbifera

References

Fungi
Fungus genera